Friedrichshagener SV 1912 is a German association football club from the Friedrichshagen district of Berlin.

SC Hohenzollern Friedrichshagen was formed in Friedrichshagen on 3 October 1912. In November 1918 it was renamed SC Burgund 1912 Friedrichshagen and in the 1920s played several seasons of second division football on the city circuit. Known as SG Friedrichshagen after World War II, it was renamed to SG Burgund 1912 Friedrichshagen e. V. in 1990.

In April 2007, SG Burgund merged with Eintracht Friedrichshagen e.V. (founded 1990) to form Friedrichshagener SV 1912. In 2014–15, the club plays in the Kreisliga A Berlin Staffel 3 (IX).

External links
Official website 
Eintracht Friedrichshagen 

Football clubs in Germany
Football clubs in Berlin
Association football clubs established in 1912
1912 establishments in Germany